Michael Linnington (born 1958) is the CEO of Wounded Warrior Project (WWP) and a retired United States Army Lieutenant General. He has more than 35 years of military experience and was the first permanent Director of the Defense POW/MIA Accounting Agency (DPAA), served as a Military Deputy to the Under the Secretary of Defense for Personnel and Readiness, was the Commanding General of the Joint Force Headquarters-National Capital Region, the Deputy Commanding General at Fort Benning, GA, Commandant of Cadets at the U.S. Military Academy at West Point and Deputy Chief of Staff for Plans and Policy for the International Security Assistance Force Joint Command in Kabul, Afghanistan.

Early life and education 
Linnington was born in Cape May, New Jersey and grew up in the Villas section of the Lower Township, New Jersey. He attended the former St. Raymond's Roman Catholic School while working in a local restaurant and nearby Citgo gas station. He then graduated Valley Forge Military Academy in 1976.

In 1980, he graduated from U.S. Military Academy at West Point where he met his wife, Brenda who also graduated from the U.S. Military Academy in 1981. He has a master's degrees in Applied Mathematics from Rensselaer Polytechnic Institute and in National Security Strategy from the National War College.

Military career 

Deputy Commanding General  in command of 75,000 troops at Fort Benning, GA.
 Promoted to Brigadier General in 2007.
 Commandant of Cadets at West Point, beginning May 2008.
 In 2009, Linnington testified to a U.S. Senate subcommittee on military suicides and prevention efforts at West Point.
 Fought in Operation Enduring Freedom in Afghanistan.
 Commanded the 3rd Brigade of the 101st Airborne Division, also known as the Screaming Eagles.
 Deputy Chief of Staff for Plans and Policy for the International Security Assistance Force Joint Command, Kabul, Afghanistan.
 Fought in Operation Iraqi Freedom in Iraq.
 Served directly under Gen. David H. Petraeus.
 Commanding General of the Military District of Washington/Joint Force Headquarters-National Capital Region.
 Commemorating Veterans Day, November 11, 2011, US President Barack Obama walked with Linnington to the Tomb of the Unknown Soldiers
On November 12, 2011, Linnington hosted the ceremony for the 150th anniversary of President Lincoln's Grand Review at Fort McNair Parade Field, Washington, DC.
 In 2012, Linnington headed the task force for President Obama's inauguration.
Military Deputy to the Under Secretary of Defense (Personnel and Readiness) from 2013 to 2015.

Awards 
 Expert Infantryman's Badge
 Combat Infantryman's Badge
 Bronze Star Medal
 Legion of Merit
 Distinguished Service Medal

Post-military career

Defense POW/MIA Accounting Agency (DPAA) 
In 2014, two organizations, the Defense Prisoner of War/Missing Personnel Office and the Joint POW/MIA Accounting Command were merged into the Defense POW/MIA Accounting Agency (DPAA). Its mission was to account for missing personnel to their families and provide accurate and timely details of their story. Lt. Gen. (Ret.) Michael S. Linnington was its first permanent director. When Linnington took over, his priorities were to continue the mission during reorganization without disrupting field operations, finish reorganization of conflict accounting, streamline and modernize operations and communications, improve communications to stakeholders, and expand partnerships.

During his time as director, the agency nearly doubled identification of missing service members.

Wounded Warrior Project (WWP) 
On July 18, 2016, Lt. Gen. (Ret.) Michael S. Linnington was appointed Chief Executive Officer of Wounded Warrior Project, a nonprofit veteran service organization that provides programs for veterans injured in service on or after 9/11. He told a reporter he felt compelled to lead WWP after he observed the organization began suffering due to a media scandal in 2016. The allegations of the scandal were later disproved by several audits and investigations held by third parties, including the Better Business Bureau's Wise Giving Alliance. Media coverage resulted in a severe drop in donations and revenue. As a result, Linnington's first actions were focused on reducing costs while maximizing impact from veteran programs, including a pay cut from the previous WWP CEO salary.

On March 9, 2017, Linnington testified to Congress about veteran healthcare needs highlighting four major areas:

 Collaboration between government and nonprofits
 Improving care for veterans with traumatic brain injury (TBI)
 Improving health insurance for severely injured veterans
 Extending In Vitro Fertilization benefits provided by the VA

On February 5, 2019, Linnington announced to ABC/NBC owned First Coast News that WWP has "turned the corner" and is doing more with less resources. "We are serving more warriors today than ever before in impactful ways that change their lives."

In April 2022, Linnington lobbied for H.R.3967 - Honoring our PACT Act of 2022, a bill to provide healthcare and resources to veterans who were exposed to toxic substances during military service.

References 

1958 births
Living people
Lieutenant generals
People from Lower Township, New Jersey
Valley Forge Military Academy and College alumni